Carl Szokoll (15 October 1915 – 25 August 2004) was an Austrian resistance fighter involved in the 20 July Plot, major in the Wehrmacht, and, after the war, author and film producer.

Early life
Szokoll was born in Vienna, the son of a low-ranking soldier in the Austrian army who had fought in the First World War and had been a long-term Russian prisoner of war. He grew up under poor circumstances in Vienna, but because he received excellent grades in primary and secondary school he was later admitted as an officer candidate in the Austrian army in 1934. In his years as a cadet, he met his wife Christl Kukula, the daughter of a Jewish Vienniese industrialist. After the Anschluss in 1938, he had to end his relationship with Kukula because of the Nuremberg laws that forbade romantic involvement with Jews. Despite this, he secretly stayed in contact with her during the next years and married her, after the war, in 1946. Together they had one son.

Because of his relationship to a half-Jewish woman (Halbjüdin as the Nuremberg laws put it), he was transferred from an élite panzer unit to the ordinary infantry regiment and fought in the first phases of World War II in Nazi Germany's assaults on Poland and France. Because he was wounded in battle, he was sent back to Vienna for work in the administration of the district of Vienna.

Involvement in the 20 July plot
In 1943, then-captain Szokoll was introduced in Berlin to colonel Claus von Stauffenberg, one of the heads of the resistance movement in the Third Reich, by the Austrian lieutenant colonel Robert Bernardis and got involved with them  by monthly visits of Robert Bernardis in Vienna since February 1944. When the 20 July plot seemed to have succeeded after Stauffenberg placed a bomb in the Führer Headquarters "Wolfsschanze", he was with Colonel Heinrich Kodre, the "Chief of Staff" in Vienna, one of the resistance's man of Stauffenberg, who executed with Colonel Kodre the orders to seize all authorities and arrest the leading members of SS and the Nazi administration.

Colonel Kodre and captain Szokoll, unlike their co-conspirators in Berlin, succeeded in rounding up nearly all Nazi officials in Vienna. When the plot leaders realized that Hitler had survived, Stauffenberg called Szokoll on a secure line in order to tell him that the attempt had failed. Although Szokoll was one of the last conspirators who had telephone contact with Stauffenberg, he was able to convince the Gestapo that he was only following orders and thus he escaped punishment as one of only a handful of conspirators who did.

Szokoll "Saviour of Vienna"
Being promoted major later in 1944, he tried to take all measures within his power to save Vienna from following the fate of so many other European cities before that had been destroyed in heavy fighting. In the first months of 1945, he got involved with the Austrian resistance movement and started to create a network of officers in order to contact the nearing Soviet Army and declare Vienna an open city. The plan was working well until early April 1945. Although Hitler had ordered the Wehrmacht to fight until the last man in the defence of Vienna, Szokoll's co-conspirators had implemented a plan that would order all troops to retreat from Vienna when the Soviets were close to the city. However, the conspiracy was discovered and Nazi officials immediately hanged the leading conspirators and searched for Szokoll. Once again, he managed to escape and, in the following days, took part in Operation Radetzky, the plan of the Austrian resistance to take over Vienna and prevent fighting as far as possible. Ultimately, the city only saw moderate fighting and the inner districts saw practically no fighting. Szokoll had acted as the provisory administrator of Vienna from the time the Wehrmacht had retreated, but was once again nearly taken prisoner by the Soviets when being accused of working for US intelligence.

Post-war career
Honoured by the reinstated Austrian government for his merits on freeing Austria from the Nazis, he started a career as author and film producer. Among his work is the script for the film Der Bockerer, the production of Die letzte Brücke (the film that made Maria Schell famous), and his own autobiography that became a bestseller. He died in Vienna in 2004.

Selected filmography
 As the Sea Rages (1959)
 Final Accord (1960)
 Call of the Forest (1965)
 House of Pleasure (1969)
 My Father, the Ape and I (1971)

Work
 Der Bockerer II : Österreich ist frei. Verlag der Apfel, Wien 1997 
 Der gebrochene Eid. Europa-Verlag, Wien 1985 
 Die Rettung Wiens 1945. Mein Leben, mein Anteil an der Verschwörung gegen Hitler und an der Befreiung Österreichs. Amalthea-Verlag, Wien 2001 
 Ludwig Jedlicka: Der zwanzigste Juli in Wien, Herold, Wien 1964

See also
 List of Austrians
 List of members of the 20 July plot

External links
 Article in the Guardian 2004
 IMDB Carl Szokoll

1915 births
2004 deaths
Austrian film producers
German Army officers of World War II
Austrian military personnel of World War II
German resistance members
Austrian resistance members
Austrian expatriates in Germany
Austrian people of Hungarian descent
Military personnel from Vienna
Members of the 20 July plot
Theresian Military Academy alumni